Scarlett Nefer Camberos Becerra (born November 20, 2000) is a professional footballer who plays as a midfielder for Liga MX Femenil side Club América. Born in the United States, she represents the Mexico women's national team.

College career
Camberos played college soccer for the UC Irvine Anteaters women's soccer team from 2018 to 2021. She scored 13 goals and 7 assists in 22 appearances during her senior-year campaign, which included two hat-tricks and the Big West Conference Offensive Player of the Year award.

Club career
Camberos signed a professional contract with América of Liga MX Femenil on December 30, 2021, and made her professional debut with Club América on January 10, 2022, in a match against Atlas. Born in Los Angeles, California, Camberos credited her father's lifelong affinity for Club América in her decision to pursue a contract with the team.

She scored 11 goals in 16 appearances during the Liga MX Femenil Torneo Clausura 2022, finishing tied for third with Stephany Mayor among all players in goals scored during the tournament and leading Club América in scoring.

On July 25, 2022, Camberos publicly accused a fan of harassing her via false social media accounts and in person. Other women's players joined her in talking about the harassment they regularly experience.

In August 2022, Camberos participated in the 2022 The Women's Cup international club friendly tournament with Club América. She was named player of the match on August 14, 2022, for her performance in a win against Tottenham Hotspur F.C. Women, in which she scored a match-winning goal.

International career
Camberos was first selected to the Mexico women's national football team on August 25, 2022, for friendlies scheduled against Angel City FC of the National Women's Soccer League and the New Zealand women's national football team in September 2022.

Career statistics

Club

References

External links
 

2000 births
Living people
Soccer players from Los Angeles
Mexican women's footballers
UC Irvine Anteaters women's soccer players
Club América (women) footballers
Liga MX Femenil players
Mexico women's international footballers
Women's association football midfielders
Expatriate footballers in Mexico